Wendy Turnbull and Marty Riessen were the defending champions but lost in the first round to Wendy White and Mike Bauer.

Anne Smith and Kevin Curren won in the final 6–4, 7–6(7–4) against JoAnne Russell and Steve Denton.

Seeds
Champion seeds are indicated in bold text while text in italics indicates the round in which those seeds were eliminated.

Draw

Final

Top half

Bottom half

References
1981 US Open – Doubles draws and results at the International Tennis Federation

Mixed Doubles
US Open (tennis) by year – Mixed doubles